A general election was held in the Philippines on May 13, 2013. It was a midterm election—the officials elected will be sworn in on June 30, 2013, midway through President Benigno Aquino III's term of office.

Being elected are 12 senators (half of the Senate), and all 229 district members of the House of Representatives. These national elections were held on the same day as local and gubernatorial elections, as well as a general election in the Autonomous Region in Muslim Mindanao. In total, there were 18,022 national and local positions up for election.

Barangay officials, including barangay captains, were elected on October 28, 2013. The elections for SK officials were held at the same day, but on September 24, 2013, the Congress of the Philippines voted to postpone of the election for at least a year.

Preparations

Registration of voters and candidates
The Commission on Elections (COMELEC) ended the year-long registration of new voters and voters transferring residences nationwide, apart from the general registration of voters in the Autonomous Region in Muslim Mindanao (ARMM) on October 31, 2012. Due to the commission not allowing an extension of registration, COMELEC offices nationwide were swamped with people on the last day of registration, although the process was mostly peaceful.

The COMELEC held a week-long separate registration for prospective candidates starting from October 1. The commission is expected to release a final list of candidates by October 6. Candidates running for the Senate should file certificates of candidacies at the commission's main office at Intramuros, while those running for the other positions should file at their local COMELEC offices.

The commission completed the cleansing of the voters list in the ARMM, rejecting  236,489 names. Most were either double registrants or were too young to vote.

Absentee voting
Registered voters who are members of the military, police, civil service and media who cannot vote at their voting precincts on election day may opt to register for local absentee voting.

Overseas
The commission removed 238,557 overseas absentee voters from the voters' list after failing to manifest their intention to vote. Out of about 915,000 overseas voters, more than 200,000 had not voted in two preceding elections and were sent notices; only 29 replied and were not removed from the voters' list. However, after being slammed by the overseas Filipinos on their disenfranchisement, the commission reinstated the 238,557 overseas absentee voters; they also extended the deadline for the period of filing of the manifestation of intent to vote until election day itself. Overseas absentee voting started on April 13, and continued until election day. Depending on the diplomatic mission, a voter may vote personally or via the mail, and via manually or via the automated system. Voting in Saudi Arabia began on April 16 after the Saudi customs refused to release the voting paraphernalia in time for April 13.

Local
Members of the police, military, members of the civil service and the media who had previously registered for local absentee voting voted for the Senate and party-list elections from April 28 to 30. Those which failed to vote at this period are still eligible to vote on election day itself. Out of the 18,332 voters that registered, 12,732 were found to be qualified by the commission and were allowed to vote. However, the commission said that the turnout was low; chairman Sixto Brillantes rued the low turnout, pointing out that the election was not on a presidential election year as the cause.

Campaigning
On January 13, the election period began. This allowed the commission to impose prohibitions on 24 activities, including a nationwide ban on guns and other deadly weapons on that day.

The commission released regulations on online campaigning on January 16. The COMELEC resolution stipulated that online propaganda can only be published on a website thrice a week, and allows advertisements in the form of pop-ups, banners and the like. Campaigning via social websites such as Twitter and Facebook would not be regulated. This is the first election the commission has regulated online campaigning. The commission dramatically reduced the amount of airtime candidates and parties can use during the campaign period. Previously, the commission imposed a 120-minute airtime limit on every TV station and 180 minutes on radio stations; for 2013, the commission capped the cumulative airtime to 120 minutes on TV and 180 minutes on radio for all networks. This was a reversion on the 2004, 2007 and 2010 elections, and returned to the original 2001 limit. The Fair Elections Act was not clear on whether the 120 minutes for TV and 180 minutes for radio were for every station or for all stations.

The commission, in a cost-saving measure, announced on January 18 that they ruled to use plastic seals with serial numbers instead of padlocks in securing ballot boxes. Chairman Sixto Brillantes remarked that padlocks are bulky and expensive, as compared to plastic seals cannot be tampered with and are cheaper. The commission expects to save more than 50% if plastic seals will be used; plastic seals would cost the commission P14 million, while padlocks would have cost them P34.2 million. The commission also announced that voters would no longer place their thumbprints on the ballot; instead signatures would be used.

On January 23, the commission announced that it will be regulating the use of political colors, logos and insignias during the campaign. It monitored television personalities on whether they are being paid to wear colors that are connected to certain candidates. The commission also imposed a right of reply provision, that would give equal time and space for charges against candidates. This was also the first time the commission imposed the rule; the rule has been heavily opposed by the press, but Commission Rene Sarmiento said the rule balances the freedom of expression and  public interest.

On mid-April, the Supreme Court issued a temporary restraining order on limiting the airtime of political advertisements by candidates by the Commission on Elections. Voting 9–6, the high court favored the petition by Team PNoy senatorial candidate Alan Peter Cayetano to halt the implementation of Resolution No. 9615 and its amendment, Resolution No. 9631. The airtime limit presently stands at an aggregate of 120 minutes in all TV networks and 180 minutes in all radio stations for all national candidates and an aggregate of 60 minutes in all TV networks and 90 minutes in all radio stations for all local candidates. Sixto Brillantes, dismayed and the high court rulings adverse to the election commission threatened to resign but later relented after a meeting with President Aquino.

Source code
Smartmatic, the source of the machines that were used in the automated elections, is embroiled in a dispute with Dominion Voting Systems over the ownership of the software that were used by the machines. This source code is mandated to be released by law. By early April, chairman Sixto Brillantes said that the deal to release the source was "97 percent" of being completed. However, on late April, Brillantes said that "I’m no longer interested because it’s too late already. Election day is so close and even if they give us the source code now, it can no longer be reviewed for lack of time." Brillantes assured the public that despite the nonexistence of the source code, the machines can still work via the binary code. On early May, senatorial candidate Richard Gordon petitioned to the Supreme Court the commission to order the latter to reveal the source code to local review groups. Gordon, who authored the law mandating the automated elections, said that the commission does not have the discretion on whether or not political parties can review the source code.

A few days after Gordon's petition, or exactly a week before the election, Brillantes announced that Smartmatic and Dominion signed an agreement releasing the source code, and that it would be presented to the public on May 8. Critics scored that the late release of the source code is not possible with only a few days remaining before the elections. On May 9, Dominion turned the source code, which was in a CD, to the commission. Dominion, the commission and SLI Global Solutions, which had certified the source code months earlier, encrypted the source code on a computer provided by the commission. The source code was then burned anew to a separate CD-R, placed inside a safety box, and was delivered to the Bangko Sentral ng Pilipinas to be kept in a vault.

Bans

Gun ban
The commission issued a nationwide gun ban that started on January 13, and will last for five months, until June 12, 2013, or a month after the election. By April 19, the number of violations to the gun ban was at 2,053.

Liquor ban
The commission also issued an "expanded" liquor ban: instead of banning intoxicating substances on election day and election eve, the commission included the four days preceding the election. Foreigners and certain hotels and similar establishments were exempted. However, the Supreme Court of the Philippines issued a restraining order reverting to the two-day liquor ban after it upheld a petition by the Food and Beverage Inc. and International Wines and Spirits Association. The commission then withdrew its resolution instituting the five-day liquor ban, reverting the ban to two days as originally intended by law.

Money ban
In order to curb vote buying, the commission issued a resolution prohibiting bank withdrawals of more than 100,000 pesos. However, Secretary of Justice Leila de Lima expressed reservations on the constitutionality of the so-called "money ban", and the Bangko Sentral ng Pilipinas has explicitly stated that it would not comply with the commission's resolution.

The commission subsequently released a supplemental resolution amending the "money ban", which gives the banks the discretion on whether to allow bank withdrawals or not. However, the Supreme Court issued a status quo ante order against the "money ban", acting upon a petition by the Bankers Association of the Philippines.

Candidates

Team Pnoy

United Nationalist Alliance

Ang Kapatiran

Democratic Party of the Philippines

Makabayan Bloc

Others

Results
Polls opened at 7:00 and there were over 52 million eligible voters to vote for the more than 18,000 positions. In addition, police and military forces were put on higher alert for expectations of violence which had resulted in about 60 deaths since campaigning began.

Congress

The congressmen elected in 2013, together with those senators elected in the 2010 elections, shall comprise the 16th Congress of the Philippines.

Senate

Twelve of the 24 seats in the Senate, or the seats up in odd-numbered years, are up for election, including the seat vacated in 2010 by the current president, Benigno Aquino III. Elections to the Senate are via plurality-at-large voting: the voter having 12 votes per candidate, and the candidates with the 12 highest number of votes being elected.

House of Representatives

All 292 seats in the House of Representatives are up. A voter had two votes in the House of Representatives elections: one for party-list representatives, which shall comprise at most 20% of the seats, and another for district representatives, which shall comprise the rest of the seats.

District elections

Elections are via first past the post system: the candidate with the highest number of votes wins that district's seat in the House of Representatives. There are 234 seats to be disputed.

Party-list election

Elections are via a closed list modified Hare quota system with a 2% election threshold. A voter may vote for one party. The parties are then ranked in descending order of votes. In the first round of seat allocation, the parties that win at least 2% of the vote win one seat each. In the second round, the remaining seats are distributed via the Hare quota, with remainders disregarded; however, a party may not win more than three seats. If the number of seats that are already distributed does not equal the number of seats reserved for party-list representatives, one seat shall be awarded to every party that did not win seats in the second round, including parties that did not surpass the 2% threshold, until the seats reserved for party-list representatives are filled up.

Major parties are prohibited from running in the party-list election, which was instituted to allow marginalized sectors of society to join the political process. With 234 district seats, and party-list seats should comprise at most 20% of the seats, there were 58 seats up for election

Autonomous Region in Muslim Mindanao elections

Originally scheduled for 2011, Congress postponed the election to 2013 in order for reforms to be put in place and for the regional election to be synchronized with the 2013 election. All seats of regional elected officials are up.

Local elections

All local government units (LGUs) had their elections on this day. Positions up are mayors, vice mayors, councilors, and if applicable, governors, vice governors and board members.

Controversies
Election watchdog AES Watch has called the 2013 elections "a technology and political disaster" due to several controversies, including premature proclamation of candidates and irregular decisions made during the canvassing.

PCOS transmission issues
On the day of elections, an estimated 18,000 voting machines, representing a quarter of the total 78,000 machines, experienced problems in transmitting the voting results. The Comelec claimed that the problems were caused not by the machines themselves, but by corrupted compact flash cards and issues with the cellular network coverage. Comelec Chairman Sixto Brillantes claimed that the Comelec was aware of problems with cellular network coverage, but deliberately kept it from the public until after the election. The poll watchdog AES Watch issued a statement on May 18, saying that up to 8.6 million votes had been affected, or possibly disenfranchised.

Philippine Long Distance Telephone Company, the Philippines' largest telecommunications company, released a statement dismissing the Comelec's allegations of cellular network problems, saying that the combined networks of Smart Communications and Sun Cellular covered every city and municipality in the country, and no unusually heavy traffic was recorded on election day.

The Comelec failed to meet its self-imposed deadline of proclaiming winners in the senatorial election 48 hours after the end of the voting period.

Senatorial winners proclamation
The COMELEC proclaimed the first six senatorial winners of the election on May 16, though only 20 percent of election results had been canvassed. Three more winners were proclaimed the following day. The winners were proclaimed alphabetically rather than by the number of votes garnered, since the vote totals had not yet been finalized. Winning candidates Nancy Binay and Koko Pimentel declined to attend the proclamation, on the advice of their lawyers.

Lack of source code review
Following the election, a poll watchdog alleged that the Comelec failed to do a review of the source code for voting machines used in the election, in violation of the Automated Election Systems Law. Under the law, the technical committee must have documented certification that the all hardware and software components were operating properly at least three months before the elections.

Vote-rigging speculation
Speculations of election fraud turned up following the elections, as the vote canvassing revealed a "60-30-10" pattern of votes—wherein administration, opposition, and independent senatorial candidates consistently obtained 60 percent, 30 percent, and 10 percent of the votes respectively.

See also
 2013 Philippine barangay elections
 Commission on Elections
 Elections in the Philippines
 Congress of the Philippines

References

External links
Official website of the Commission on Elections
 Philippine 2013 Election Results
Election 2013, Philippine Star special coverage
Election 2013, Solar News special coverage
Eleksyon 2013, GMA News special coverage
Halalan 2013, ABS-CBN News special coverage
Hatol ng Bayan, PTV/IBC/PBS/Manila Bulletin special coverage
Pagbabago 2013, News5 special coverage
PHVote 2013, Rappler special coverage
Family affair: Philippine political dynasties

 
2013
2013 elections in the Philippines
2013 elections in Asia